The  Defender-class boat, also called Response Boat–Small (RB-S) and Response Boat–Homeland Security (RB-HS), is a standard boat introduced by the United States Coast Guard in 2002. The boats serve a variety of missions, including search and rescue, port security and law enforcement duties and replaces a variety of smaller non-standard boats.

The boat requires a minimum crew of two persons, but has a carrying capacity for ten persons. The boat is easily trailerable and can be transported by a C-130 Hercules aircraft or truck.

Although similar in appearance to a rigid-hulled inflatable boat, the Defender is actually an aluminum-hulled vessel, equipped with a rigid foam-filled flotation collar. The first generation of boats were built by SAFE Boats International of Bremerton, Washington, a vendor of government and law enforcement boats. The replacement second generation was ordered in 2011 from Metal Shark Boats.

Design

The Defender class utilizes a rigid deep-V hull constructed of marine grade aluminum. While similar in appearance to the sponson of a rigid-hulled inflatable boat the Defenders' collar is actually made from rigid polyethylene foam. The boat is powered by two  outboard engines, usually Honda four-strokes though Mercury and Johnson engines have also been used. Tow bitts are fitted forward and aft which also serve as mounting points for M240B or M60 machine guns.

Variants

A class

The Defender A class or Response Boat–Homeland Security (RB-HS) was the first version of the Defender class and entered service in 2002. Some A-class boats in service with the Maritime Security Response Team (MSRT) have gray collars instead of the more common orange.

B class
The Defender B class, also known as the Response Boat–Small (RB-S) is a further development of the A class. First entering service in 2003 it has a slightly longer cabin, additional spotter windows aft, shock mitigating cabin seats, a smaller  fuel tank, and various other minor changes. It is the most common of the three classes.

C class
The Defender C class, sometimes known as the Response Boat Small–Charlie, is a modification of the B class and was designed as a replacement for the aging  Transportable Port Security Boats (TPSB) currently used by Port Security Units. The C class has a gray foam collar, a cabin climate control system, and an increased armament of one M2HB .50-caliber machine gun on a modified forward mount and two M240B machine guns on port and starboard mounts just aft of the cabin. 

The first C-class boats were delivered to Port Security Unit 305 in May 2008 for testing and entered operational service at Naval Station Guantanamo Bay, Cuba in 2009.

Service life and replacement
With the Defender-class boats nearing the end of their ten-year service life, the United States Coast Guard issued a request for proposal for replacement design for the Response Boat-Small.

Contracts were awarded for two boats, one from SAFE Boats International and one from Metal Shark Aluminum Boats, for testing and on September 26, 2011 the Coast Guard awarded a contract to Metal Shark Boats for the production of 38 Response Boats-Small. In November, Metal Shark was awarded a $192 million contract for up to 500 response boats—470 to replace the entirety of the Coast Guard's 2002-built fleet, 20 for the US Border Patrol, and 10 for the US Navy.

Operators
 (coast guard)

Israel Police

 Liberian Coast Guard

 Togolese Armed Forces operates one
 United States Navy

See also
Equipment of the United States Coast Guard
Response boat-medium

References

External links

U.S. Coast Guard: Response boat-small fact sheet (PDF)

Defender
Deployable Operations Group